The 1987 Laurence Olivier Awards were held in 1987 in London celebrating excellence in West End theatre by the Society of London Theatre.

Winners and nominees
Details of winners (in bold) and nominees, in each award category, per the Society of London Theatre.

Productions with multiple nominations and awards
The following 17 productions received multiple nominations:

 4: Kiss Me, Kate
 3: A Lie of the Mind, A View from the Bridge, Groucho: A Life in Revue and Up on the Roof
 2: A Penny for a Song, Antony and Cleopatra, Blues in the Night, Follies, Lettice and Lovage, Macbeth (Lyttelton), Medea, Sarcophagus, The Rover, The Two Noble Kinsmen, Three Men on a Horse and Twelfth Night

The following three productions received multiple awards:

 2: A View from the Bridge, Antony and Cleopatra and Kiss Me, Kate

See also
 41st Tony Awards

References

External links
 Previous Olivier Winners – 1987

Laurence Olivier Awards ceremonies
Laurence Olivier Awards, 1987
Laurence Olivier Awards
Laurence Olivier Awards